The De La Galette River (French: "Rivière de la Galette") is a tributary of the southern shore of Gouin Reservoir (Bouzanquet Bay), flowing into the territory of the town of La Tuque, in the administrative region of the Mauricie, in Quebec, in Canada.

The "River Galette" flows successively in the townships of Fréchette and Delâge, south of the Gouin reservoir and the west side of the upper Saint-Maurice River. Forestry is the main economic activity of this valley; recreational tourism activities, second.

Some secondary forest roads are in use nearby for forestry and recreational tourism activities.

The surface of the "De La Galette River" is usually frozen from mid-November to the end of April, however, safe ice circulation is generally from early December to late March.

Geography

Toponymy

Notes and references

See also 

Rivers of Mauricie
La Tuque, Quebec